The Men's 400 metre freestyle S10 event at the 2020 Paralympic Games took place on 1 September 2021, at the Tokyo Aquatics Centre.

Records

Heats
The swimmers with the top 8 times, regardless of heat, advanced to the final.

Final

See also
 Swimming at the 2016 Summer Paralympics – Men's 400 metre freestyle S10

References

Swimming at the 2020 Summer Paralympics